Ichthyander may refer to:

Ichthyander, the name of the main character in Amphibian Man, a Russian science fiction adventure published in 1928
Also in Amphibian Man (film) (1962)
Ichthyander Project, the first Soviet underwater habitat, in the 1960s, initiated by the Ichthyander diving club